The Nashville Network, usually referred to as TNN, was an American country music-oriented cable television network. Programming included music videos, taped concerts, movies, game shows, syndicated programs, and numerous talk shows. On September 25, 2000, after an attempt to attract younger viewers failed, TNN's country music format was changed and the network was renamed The National Network, eventually becoming Spike TV in 2003 and Paramount Network in 2018.

On November 1, 2012, the network was revived as a digital broadcast television network. However, this lasted only 11 months, and the channel changed its name to Heartland on October 9, 2013. Several sports genre console computer games were released with TNN license.

History

Beginnings
The Nashville Network was launched as a basic cable and satellite television network on March 7, 1983, operating from the now-defunct Opryland USA theme park near Nashville, Tennessee. Country Music Television (CMT), founded by Glenn D. Daniels, beat TNN's launch by two days to become the first country music cable television network.

TNN was originally owned by WSM, Inc., a subsidiary of National Life and Accident Insurance Company that owned several broadcasting and tourism properties in Nashville and the traditional country radio and stage show The Grand Ole Opry, and initially focused on country music-related original programming. TNN's flagship shows included Nashville Now and Grand Ole Opry Live, both of which were broadcast live from Opryland USA. During TNN's first year of broadcasting, American General Corporation, parent company of NL&AIC, put the network up for sale, along with the other NL&AI properties, in an effort to focus on its core businesses.

Gaylord ownership (1983–1997)
The Gaylord Entertainment Company purchased TNN and the Opryland properties in the latter half of 1983. Much of TNN's programming during the Gaylord era was originally produced by Opryland Productions, also owned by Gaylord Entertainment. Programming included variety shows, talk shows, game shows (such as Fandango and Top Card), outdoors shows, and lifestyle shows, all centered in some way around country music or Southern U.S. culture. Some of TNN's popular on-air talent included Miss America 1983 Debra Maffett (TNN Country News), and local Nashville media personalities Ralph Emery, Dan Miller, Charlie Chase, Lorianne Crook and Gary Beaty, as well as established stars such as country music singer Bill Anderson and actresses Florence Henderson and Dinah Shore. TNN even created stars, such as wily professional fisherman Bill Dance. Grand Ole Opry singer and 1960s country star Bobby Lord, known for his skills as a sportsman and living in his native Florida, hosted the program Country Sportsman, featuring hunting and fishing excursions with various country stars. Inspired by ABC's The American Sportsman, the TNN show was later renamed Celebrity Sportsman after ABC objected to the similarity to its program. One of the most popular shows that aired on the network during this time was a variety show hosted by the country music quartet The Statler Brothers.

In 1986, TNN started airing rodeo events, beginning with the Mesquite Championship Rodeo. 

In 1991, Gaylord Entertainment purchased TNN's chief competitor, CMT, and operated it in tandem with TNN. CMT continued to show country music videos exclusively throughout Gaylord's ownership. Following the acquisition, TNN quickly phased out its music video blocks, while directing viewers to CMT for such fare.

In 1993, Emery began a short-lived retirement from broadcasting, and left Nashville Now in the process. Upon Emery's exit, the show was merged with fellow TNN program Crook & Chase and renamed Music City Tonight (hosted by Lorianne Crook and Charlie Chase). The same year, TNN Country News debuted and was hosted by Debra Maffett. The programming block TNN Outdoors debuted in 1993, and featured hunting and fishing shows, as well as PRCA rodeo and PBR bull riding. In 1996, Crook and Chase left the show to relaunch their eponymous program in daytime syndication; it would return exclusively to TNN in 1997. Meanwhile, Music City Tonight was again overhauled to more closely resemble its original Nashville Now format, but was rebranded as Prime Time Country. This version was originally hosted by actor Tom Wopat (of The Dukes of Hazzard fame). He was later replaced with singer/songwriter Gary Chapman, who enjoyed relative success with the show until its cancellation in 1999 as part of the network's change of focus.

TNN had two subdivisions focused on specialty programming: TNN Outdoors and TNN Motor Sports. In 1998, country singer Tracy Byrd became the on-air spokesman for the TNN Outdoors block, and stayed until 2000. TNN Motor Sports was responsible for production of all of the network's auto racing and motorsports coverage. Regarding the latter, NASCAR races (including those of the then-Winston Cup Series, Busch Grand National Series, and Craftsman Truck Series) were the most prominently featured. However, races of other series such as IMSA, IRL, ASA, World of Outlaws, and NHRA were also showcased, as were motorcycle and monster truck racing. TNN Outdoors and TNN Motor Sports also were marketed as separate entities, selling a variety of merchandise and being branded onto video games such as TNN Bass Tournament of Champions and TNN Outdoors Bass Tournament '96.

In 1995, the network's motorsports operations were moved into the industrial park located at Charlotte Motor Speedway in Concord, North Carolina, where TNN had purchased controlling interest in World Sports Enterprises, a motorsports production company. Notable TNN racing personalities included Mike Joy, Steve Evans, Eli Gold, Buddy Baker, Neil Bonnett, Randy Pemberton, Ralph Sheheen, Dick Berggren, Matt Yocum, Brock Yates, Paul Page, Don Garlits, Gary Gerould, Army Armstrong, and Rick Benjamin.  

The outdoors and motorsports programs were so successful that, by the early 1990s, only those shows were seen on Sundays, with no musical programming.

Westinghouse-CBS/Viacom ownership (1997–2000)
Westinghouse Electric, who at the time owned the CBS network and had an existing relationship with TNN through its Group W division, purchased TNN and its sister network CMT outright in 1997 to form the CBS Cable division, along with a short-lived startup network entitled Eye On People.

Most of the original entertainment-oriented programming ceased production during this period, and the network began to rely more on TNN Outdoors and TNN Motor Sports for programming. The network's ties to CBS allowed it to pick up Southern-themed CBS dramas from the 1980s such as The Dukes of Hazzard and Dallas, and also allowed it to carry CBS Sports' overruns, which happened during a NASCAR Busch Series race at Texas Motor Speedway and also a PGA Tour event at Firestone Country Club. It also broadcast the 1998 Pepsi 400 on October 17, 1998, after CBS was unable to air it on the rescheduled date (from July 4, due to the 1998 Florida wildfires).

The late 1990s also saw the network's first attempts to distance itself from its country music/rural lifestyle image and court a younger demographic, one more attractive to potential advertisers. In 1998, the network dropped its "The Nashville Network" moniker and shortened its official name to TNN, and ownership shifted to Viacom in 2000 after that company's acquisition of Westinghouse's successor, CBS Corporation. TNN subsequently moved from its original Nashville headquarters to New York City and was folded into Viacom's MTV Networks division; sister network CMT, however, remained situated in Nashville and began to venture away from 24/7 music videos, in favor of lifestyle programming.

1998 witnessed the premiere of RollerJam, which brought roller derby back to television for the first time in almost a decade. The next year, TNN began its relationship with professional wrestling, signing a three-year deal with Extreme Championship Wrestling (ECW). ECW on TNN was the highest-rated show on TNN through 2000, despite limited advertising (which was a point of contention with ECW officials). ECW on TNN and RollerJam formed the core of the network's "Friday Night Thrill Zone" program block, which was responsible for an increase in the network's young male viewership on Friday nights.

Format change

In 2000, Viacom sensed redundancy among its TNN and CMT properties and, catalyzed by its acquisition of the rights to World Wrestling Federation (WWF, now WWE) programming, decided to refocus TNN. The network was renamed The National Network on September 25 (later The New TNN) and reformatted to compete with TNT, TBS, and USA Network by attracting viewers in the 18 to 49-year-old demographic. Prior to 2000, over half of TNN's viewers were 55 years old and over. Only one-third of them were between the ages of 18 and 49, according to Nielsen Media Research.

Some of TNN's programming included off-network sitcoms such as Diff'rent Strokes, WKRP in Cincinnati, The Wonder Years, and Taxi and the failed relaunch of The Ren & Stimpy Show as Ren & Stimpy "Adult Party Cartoon". Eventually, male-oriented shows, such as Baywatch, Miami Vice, Monster Jam, Robot Wars and Star Trek: The Next Generation were added to the network's lineup as the demographic was changed to target "young adult males". This change in the target demographic led The New TNN to be relaunched as Spike TV in August 2003, and then renamed to simply Spike in 2006.

In 2008, Spike was available in 96.1 million American homes, and the average age of its viewers was 42. The network featured re-runs of popular shows such as CSI, CSI: NY, Unsolved Mysteries, Married... with Children, UFC events, and various original programs and movies. It was also the home of the professional wrestling organization Total Nonstop Action Wrestling's flagship show Impact Wrestling until January 2015, when the show moved to Destination America.

Spike was rebranded as the Paramount Network on January 18, 2018.

Revival

On April 16, 2012, it was announced that Luken Communications and Jim Owens Entertainment would relaunch The Nashville Network as a digital broadcast television network on November 1, 2012.  Jim Owens Entertainment, producer of the Crook & Chase television program and the Crook & Chase Top 40 Countdown radio show (among other programs), acquired The Nashville Network trademark, logo, and some archived programming.

In October 2013, the partnership between Jim Owens Entertainment and Luken Communications ended, and The Nashville Network name was changed to Heartland. The rebranded network continued to carry the same format and programming. As part of the split, Jim Owens Entertainment retained TNN's branding.

On April 24, 2019, corporate TV station owner Gray Television announced a joint-venture country music broadcasting service with Opry Entertainment Group (the legal successor to TNN's founding company, WSM, Inc.), which became Circle. The services would consist of a broadcast digital network and an OTT streaming platform. The joint venture would be based in Nashville under General Manager Drew Riefenberger. Gray would contribute distribution and marketing capabilities, multicast knowledge and affiliate all its TV stations' subchannels with the new service. This represents the third attempt to revive the pre-2000 concept of TNN, but without the branding due to the TNN trademark now owned by Jim Owens Entertainment. Owens died on March 4, 2022.

Programming

See also
Great American Country, former competitor and current home to some former TNN programs
RFD-TV (Rural Free Delivery TV) a network launched in 2000 with similar programming to TNN.

References

Defunct television networks in the United States
American country music
Ryman Hospitality Properties
Music video networks in the United States
Television channels and stations established in 1983
Television channels and stations disestablished in 2000
Television channels and stations established in 2012
Television channels and stations disestablished in 2013
1983 establishments in Tennessee
2000 disestablishments in Tennessee
2012 establishments in Tennessee
2013 disestablishments in Tennessee
Companies based in Nashville, Tennessee
Spike (TV network)
Paramount Network
Westinghouse Broadcasting
Country music mass media